Erebomorpha is a genus of moths in the family Geometridae erected by Francis Walker in 1860.

Species
Erebomorpha consors Butler, 1878
Erebomorpha fulguraria Walker, 1860
Erebomorpha fulgurita Walker, 1860

References

Boarmiini